Mihály Gellér (born 5 August 1947) is a Hungarian ski jumper. He competed in the normal hill and large hill events at the 1968 Winter Olympics.

References

External links
 

1947 births
Living people
Hungarian male ski jumpers
Olympic ski jumpers of Hungary
Ski jumpers at the 1968 Winter Olympics
Sportspeople from Békés County